Vladan Elesin (born 12 December 1995) is a Serbian footballer who plays for Loznica in the Serbian First League.

References

External links
Profile at Football Database
Profile at Soccerbase

1995 births
Living people
Serbian footballers
Association football goalkeepers
RFK Novi Sad 1921 players
FK Cement Beočin players
FK Proleter Novi Sad players
FK ČSK Čelarevo players
FK Trayal Kruševac players
FK Kabel players
Serbian SuperLiga players
Serbian First League players